Min Hae-kyung (born April 18, 1962) is a South Korean female singer.  She became famous as a performing artist in the 1980s and is noted for her singing and dancing.

Biography
She was a student at Seoul National Art High School, and made her debut in 1980. An early popular song was her ballad "One Girl's Love Story" (어느 소녀의 사랑이야기). She is married and has one daughter.

Her hobbies include dancing and golf. She speaks Japanese and is familiar with classical dance.

Awards
 1990, Grand Prize Winner of ABU Song Contest
 1994, Grand Prize Winner of Teenager Song Contest

Discography

Albums
 Min Hae Kyung Vol. 2, 1983
 Min Hae Kyung, 1986
 Best 11, 1988
 Min Hae Kyung 9, 1989
 Jump '90, 1990
 Best 2, 1991
 Jump '91, 1991
 Love in Me, 1992
 Best Collection, 1993
 Best of Best, 1995
 Wind of Change, 1995
 Remember, 1996
 U And Me, 1999
 Min Hae Kyung Best – Rose, 2002
 Golden, 2006
 "Vol. 17th: Balance", 2013

Filmography

References
 / Min Hae Kyung in Maniadb
 / Min Hae Kyung in EPG Star Information
 / Min Hae Kyung Q&A in Daum

1962 births
K-pop singers
Living people
South Korean female idols
South Korean women pop singers